Darite is a village in the civil parish of St Cleer (where the 2011 census population  was included), Cornwall, England, United Kingdom. It is three miles (5 km) north of Liskeard.

References

External links

Villages in Cornwall